The 2019 UK & Ireland Greyhound Racing Year is the 94th year of greyhound racing in the United Kingdom and Ireland. The year marked an end of an era when the 94-year-old company the Greyhound Racing Association (GRA) or more recently the GRA Acquisition came to an end.

Roll of honour

Summary
All news was overshadowed by the demise of the once-great Greyhound Racing Association, more recently known as the GRA and then Clive Feltham's GRA Acquisition. The company had been declining since 2005, following the sale from Wembley plc to Risk Capital Partners and Galliard Homes and the inevitable resulted when the final two leases held at Belle Vue Stadium and Perry Barr Stadium were sold to the Arena Racing Company (ARC) in October. The company had brought racing to the United Kingdom in 1925 and had been the primary promoter for 70 years. 

Positive news was announced in January when major bookmakers agreed to pay a voluntary payment into the British Greyhound Racing Fund from their internet businesses. The agreement was signed by Ladbrokes Coral, William Hill, Betfred, bet365, Paddy Power Betfair and Sky Betting & Gaming and was expected to generate an extra £3 million for the fund, which goes directly towards greyhound welfare connected to Greyhound Board of Great Britain tracks in the UK. The move was welcomed by the industry who had been asking the bookmakers for assistance towards welfare funding for some time.

The year ended badly with the news that housing planning permission for Belle Vue had been passed on 19 December.

News
The media rights war raged on between SIS and ARC. Contracts had been signed by the tracks but some trainers were moving to tracks with SIS contracts that offered a better deal. The industry continued to wait to see long term consequences of the media rights battle. 

The media rights battle had already affected the open race schedule, the ARC owned Sunderland scrapped the William Hill Grand Prix and vastly reduced the prize money for the Classic. Another consequence of the media rights battle was the change to the racing schedule at tracks, which now generally consisted of daytime racing and a Saturday night fixture.

There was a double retirement during June with both the 2017 Greyhound of the Year King Elvis and 2017 Scottish Derby champion Dorotas Woo Hoo finishing their careers. 2018 English Greyhound Derby champion Dorotas Wildcat was also retired after a gallant attempt to defend his title in the summer.

Ireland
The new English Derby champion Priceless Blake returned to action against a high class field in the Dundalk International and finished runner-up to Irish Oaks champion Killmacdonagh in the €20,000 one-off race, the latter had recently broke two track records.

Drumbo Park re-opened on 13 July under the management of 'Run With Passion Ltd'. The track opened on the back of a news program by Raidió Teilifís Éireann billed as an exposé on excess breeding within Irish racing. The program drew criticism of breeder practices in Ireland but the industry also criticised RTE and its failure to include coursing, international sales, independent tracks etc. in the report. The Irish Greyhound Board condemned the breeder practices shown in the program and vowed to take action under the new Greyhound Racing Ireland Act 2019. Additionally the Bord na gCon was renamed the Rásaíocht Con Éireann (Greyhound Racing Ireland). During October 2019 the IGB released the latest statistics appertaining to welfare under the Strategic Plan 2018–2022.

Leading journalist and broadcaster Michael Fortune died.

The Patrick Guilfoyle trained Skywalker Logan won the Cesarewitch and the Corn Cuchulainn; the white and black dog also had a great English Derby campaign and was making a great case for being voted Irish Greyhound of the Year. The other contenders would be Killmacdonagh and the two Derby champions Lenson Bocko and Priceless Blake. The winner was Killmacdonagh, Lenson Bocko was dog of the year and Skywalker Logan was surprisingly not event named stayer of the year losing out to Redzer Ardfert.

Competitions
Angela Harrison won her first Trainers Championship defeating the in form Patrick Janssens and former champions Kevin Hutton and Mark Wallis. Harrison only took over the kennels from partner Jimmy Wright in 2017. Wright was integral in helping Harrison win the title, as were her two powerhouses Droopys Expert and Droopys Verve who both produced strong wins. The pair then immediately headed for the Scottish Derby where Verve recorded the fastest heat win and Expert progressed to the semi finals behind Boylesports Xtra. The prolific King Turbo also won a heat but of the four only Droopys Verve qualified for the final by producing the fastest 29.02 win in the semi finals. However the final went to Irish entry Braveheart Bobby from Cooneen Jack with Droopys Verve failing to recover from a poor start taking third.

Trafalgar Cup champion King Sheeran deservedly won the 73rd British Bred Two-Year-Old Produce Stakes and led home his two brothers King Cash and King Dylan for a litter 1-2-3; Liz McNair trained the first four home because the trio's half sister Queen Cher finished fourth. The racing year belonged to Ireland meaning that the selection of a UK Greyhound of the Year would not be straight forward but Ice on Fire stood out after gaining four major wins in the Puppy Classic, All England Cup and the Eclipse and the Laurels. He was duly awarded the title during the following January awards.

Mark Wallis ended the year with 1120 open race points and therefore retaining his Greyhound Trainer of the Year title and extending his record to eleven titles.

Principal UK finals

Principal Irish finals

UK Category 1 & 2 competitions

Irish feature competitions

References 

Greyhound racing in the United Kingdom
Greyhound racing in the Republic of Ireland
UK and Ireland Greyhound Racing Year
UK and Ireland Greyhound Racing Year
UK and Ireland